Mostufaabad (also Romanized as Mostūfáābād; also known as Makīneh-ye Ḩāj Karīm, Mostavfīābād, and Mostowfīābād) is a village in Abdoliyeh-ye Gharbi Rural District, in the Central District of Ramshir County, Khuzestan Province, Iran. At the 2006 census, its population was 21, in 4 families.

References 

Populated places in Ramshir County